The Knight's Cross of the Iron Cross, or simply the Knight's Cross, and its variants, were the highest awards in the military and paramilitary forces of Nazi Germany during World War II.

The Knight's Cross was awarded for a wide range of reasons and across all ranks, from a senior commander for skilled leadership of his troops in battle to a low-ranking soldier for a single act of military valour.

The award was instituted on 1 September 1939, at the onset of the German invasion of Poland. The award was created to replace the many older merit and bravery neck awards of the German Empire. A higher grade, the Oak Leaves to the Knight's Cross, was instituted in 1940. In 1941, two higher grades of the Knight's Cross with Oak Leaves were instituted: the Knight's Cross with Oak Leaves and Swords and the Knight's Cross with Oak Leaves, Swords and Diamonds. At the end of 1944 the final grade, the Knight's Cross with Golden Oak Leaves, Swords and Diamonds, was created. Over 7,000 awards were made during the course of the war.

Historic background

The Prussian king Friedrich Wilhelm III established the Iron Cross at the beginning of the German campaign as part of the Napoleonic Wars. The design was a silver-framed cast iron cross on 13. March 1813. Iron was a material which symbolised defiance and reflected the spirit of the age. The Prussian state had mounted a campaign steeped in patriotic rhetoric to rally their citizens to repulse the French occupation. To finance the army, the king implored wealthy Prussians to turn in their jewels in exchange for a men's cast-iron ring or a ladies' brooch, each bearing the legend "Gold I gave for iron" (Gold gab ich für Eisen).  The award was reinstituted for the wars in 1870 and 1914.

With the outbreak of World War II on 1 September 1939, Adolf Hitler in his role as commander in chief of the German armed forces decreed the renewal of the Iron Cross of 1939. A new grade of the Iron Cross series was introduced, the Knight's Cross of the Iron Cross. The Knight's Cross of the Iron Cross, without distinction, was awarded to officers and soldiers alike, conforming with the National Socialist slogan: "One people, one nation, one leader".

Analysis of the German Federal Archives revealed evidence for 7,161 officially bestowed recipients. The German Federal Archives substantiate 863 awards of the Oak Leaves to the Knight's Cross, along with the 147 Swords and 27 Diamonds awards.

Grades
The legal grounds for this decree had been established in 1937 with the German law of Titles, Orders and Honorary Signs that made the Führer and President of Germany the only person who was allowed to award orders or honorary signs. The re-institution of the Iron Cross was therefore a Führer decree, which had political implication since the Treaty of Versailles had explicitly prohibited the creation of a military decoration, order or medal. However, Germany had formally renounced the Treaty by this time. The renewal for the first time had created an honorary sign of the entire German state.

As the war progressed four additional years, leaders had to distinguish those who had already won the Knight's Cross of the Iron Cross or one of the higher grades and who continued to show merit in combat bravery or military success. The Knight's Cross was eventually awarded in five grades:

 Knight's Cross of the Iron Cross
 Knight's Cross of the Iron Cross with Oak Leaves
 Knight's Cross of the Iron Cross with Oak Leaves and Swords
 Knight's Cross of the Iron Cross with Oak Leaves, Swords, and Diamonds
 Knight's Cross of the Iron Cross with Golden Oak Leaves, Swords, and Diamonds.

Knight's Cross

The Knight's Cross of the Iron Cross instituted on 1. September 1939. Its appearance was very similar to the Iron Cross. Its shape was that of a cross pattée, a cross that has arms which are narrow at the center and broader at the perimeter. The most common Knight's Crosses were produced by the manufacturer Steinhauer & Lück in Lüdenscheid. The Steinhauer & Lück crosses are stamped with the digits "800", indicating 800 grade silver, on the reverse side.

Knight's Cross with Oak Leaves
The Knight's Cross of the Iron Cross with Oak Leaves (Ritterkreuz des Eisernen Kreuzes mit Eichenlaub) was instituted on 3. June 1940. Before the introduction of the Oak Leaves only 124 members of the Wehrmacht had received the Knight's Cross. Prior to Case Yellow, the attack on the Netherlands, Belgium and France, just 52 Knight's Crosses had been awarded. In May 1940 the number of presentations peaked. The timing for the introduction of the Oak Leaves is closely linked to Case Red, the second and decisive phase of the Battle of France.

Like the Knight's Cross to which it was added, the Oak Leaves clasp could be awarded for leadership, distinguished service or personal gallantry. The Oak Leaves, just like the 1813 Iron Cross and Grand Cross of the Iron Cross, was not a National Socialist invention. They originally appeared in conjunction with the Golden Oak Leaves of the Order of the Red Eagle, which was the second highest Prussian order after the Order of the Black Eagle. The king also awarded the Oak Leaves together with the Pour le Mérite since 9. October 1813 for gallantry.

Knight's Cross with Oak Leaves and Swords
The Knight's Cross of the Iron Cross with Oak Leaves and Swords (Ritterkreuz des Eisernen Kreuzes mit Eichenlaub und Schwertern) was instituted on 15 July 1941. The Oak Leaves with Swords clasp was similar in appearance to the Oak Leaves clasp with the exception that a pair of crossed swords were soldered to the base of the Oak Leaves.

Knight's Cross with Oak Leaves, Swords, and Diamonds
The Knight's Cross with Oak Leaves, Swords, and Diamonds (Ritterkreuz des Eisernen Kreuzes mit Eichenlaub, Schwertern und Brillanten) was instituted on 15 July 1941. The first recipients were Werner Mölders and Adolf Galland. Presentation of the Diamonds came as a set and included the more elaborate A-piece and a second clasp with rhinestones for everyday wear, the B-piece. The Diamonds were awarded 27 times during World War II. However three individuals never received a set of Diamonds. Hans-Joachim Marseille, the fourth recipient, was killed in an aircraft crash prior to its presentation. The deteriorating situation and the end of the war prevented its presentation to Karl Mauss, the 26th recipient and Dietrich von Saucken, the 27th and final recipient.

Knight's Cross with Golden Oak Leaves, Swords, and Diamonds
The Knight's Cross with Golden Oak Leaves, Swords, and Diamonds (Ritterkreuz des Eisernen Kreuzes mit Goldenem Eichenlaub, Schwertern und Brillanten) was instituted on 29 December 1944. This medal was the highest level, originally intended for 12 of the most distinguished servicemen in the entire German armed forces after the war ended. Six sets of Golden Oak Leaves were manufactured, each consisting of an A-piece, made of 18 Carat gold with 58 real diamonds and a B-piece, made of 14 Carat with 68 real sapphires. One of these sets was presented to Hans-Ulrich Rudel on 1 January 1945; the remaining five sets were taken to Schloss Klessheim, where they were taken by the US forces.

Nomination and approval procedure

To qualify for the Knight's Cross, a soldier had to already hold the 1939 Iron Cross First Class, though the Iron Cross First Class was awarded concurrently with the Knight's Cross in some cases. Unit commanders could also be awarded the medal for the exemplary conduct of the unit as a whole. Also, U-boat commanders could qualify for sinking 100,000 tons of shipping and Luftwaffe pilots could qualify for accumulating 20 "points" (with one point being awarded for shooting down a single-engine plane, two points for a twin-engine plane and three for a four-engine plane, with all points being doubled at night). It was issued from 1939 to 1945, with the requirements being gradually raised as the war went on.

Nominations for the Knight's Cross could be made at company level or higher. Commanders could not nominate themselves. In this instance the division adjutant made the recommendation. In the Luftwaffe the lowest level was the Geschwader and in the Kriegsmarine the respective flotilla was authorized to make the nomination. It was also possible to nominate subordinated foreign units. The nomination by the troop had to be submitted in writing and in double copy. The format and the content were predefined. Every nomination contained the personal data, the rank and unit at the time of the act, since when the soldier held this position, the military service entry date, previous military decorations awarded and date of presentation, etc. For enlisted soldiers and noncommissioned officers the résumé had to be submitted as well.

The nomination had to be forwarded in writing by a courier up the official command chain. Every intermittent administrative office or commander between the nominating unit and the commander-in-chief of the respective Wehrmacht branch (commander-in-chief of the Heer, commander-in-chief of the Luftwaffe and commander-in-chief of the Kriegsmarine with their respective staff offices) had to give their approval along with a short comment. In exceptional cases, such as the nominated individual had sustained severe injuries or that the command chain had been interrupted, a nomination could be submitted via teleprinter communication.

At first, the recipient of the Knight's Cross, or one of its higher grades, received a brief telegram informing him of the award of the Knight's Cross of the Iron Cross. Thereafter he received a Vorläufiges Besitzzeugnis (Preliminary Testimonial of Ownership). The award was also noted in the recipients Soldbuch (Soldiers Pay Book), his Wehrpass (Military Identification) and personnel records.

Approval authority

1 September 1939 to 20 April 1945
Administration/Berlin (preliminary decision) → Chief of the Heerespersonalamt/Berlin (preliminary decision) → Oberkommando der Wehrmacht-Department/Berlin (presenting) → Hitler (decision)

The Army Personnel Branch Office was split due to the deteriorating war situation and was moved to Marktschellenberg in the time frame 21 to 24 April 1945.

25 April 1945 to 30 April 1945 (Hitler's death)
Administration/Marktschellenberg (preliminary decision) → deputy Chief of the Heerespersonalamt/Marktschellenberg (preliminary decision) → Chief of the HPA/Berlin (preliminary decision) → OKW-Department/Berlin (presenting) → Hitler (decision)

30 April 1945 to 3 May 1945
The approval authority of the Knight's Cross of the Iron Cross became confusing after Hitler's death on 30 April 1945. General Ernst Maisel, deputy chief of Army Personnel Office, was authorized by the Presidential Chancellery to approve presentations of the Knights Cross effective as of 28 April 1945. Maisel, on 30 April, legally approved and conferred 33 Knight's Crosses, rejected 29 nominations, and deferred four. Hitler's death ended Maisel's authority to approve nominations. The authority to approve and make presentations was passed on to Hitler's successor as Staatsoberhaupt (Head of State) Karl Dönitz, who held the title of Reichspräsident (President) and Supreme Commander of the Armed Forces.

3 May 1945 to 8 May 1945 (Nazi Germany surrenders) 
A teleprinter message dated 3 May 1945 was sent to the Commanders-in-Chief of those units still engaged in combat, empowering them to make autonomous presentations of the Knight's Cross of the Iron Cross themselves. The following decision making chains of command were possible at this time:

Northern sector
Administration (preliminary decision) → Chief of the Heerespersonalamt/Flensburg (preliminary decision) → Chief of the OKW/Flensburg (presenting) → Dönitz/Flensburg (decision)
Commander-in-Chief North: Ernst Busch
Commander-in-Chief Army Group Courland: Carl Hilpert
Commander-in-Chief East Prussia: Dietrich von Saucken
Commander-in-Chief Norway: Franz Böhme
Commander-in-Chief Denmark: Georg Lindemann
Commander-in-Chief Army Group Vistula: Kurt von Tippelskirch (the army group was destroyed on 3 May 1945 and removed from the distribution list)
Southern sector
Commander-in-Chief Army Group G: Albert Kesselring
Commander-in-Chief Army Group E: Alexander Löhr
Commander-in-Chief Army Group Ostmark: Lothar Rendulic
Commander-in-Chief Army Group Centre: Ferdinand Schörner
Commander-in-Chief Army Group C: Heinrich von Vietinghoff (the army group surrendered on 2 May 1945 and removed from the distribution list)

Dönitz-decree
Grand Admiral Karl Dönitz, as President of Germany and Hitler's successor as Head of State and Supreme Commander of the Armed Forces, soon declared that "All nominations for the bestowal of the Knight's Cross of the Iron Cross and their higher grades which have been received by the Oberkommando der Wehrmacht — staff of the Wehrmacht high command — until the capitulation becomes effective are approved, under the premise that all nominations are formally and correctly approved by the nominating authorities of the Wehrmacht, Heer including the Waffen-SS, Kriegsmarine and Luftwaffe all the way to the level of the field army and army group leadership."

This "Dönitz-decree" (Dönitz-Erlaß) is most likely dated from 7 May 1945. Manfred Dörr, author of various publications related to the Knight's Cross of the Iron Cross, requested legal counsel on this decree in 1988. The Deutsche Dienststelle (WASt) came to the conclusion that this decree is unlawful and bears no legal justification. This blanket decree is not in line with the law governing the bestowal of the Knight's Cross of the Iron Cross which requires a case-by-case decision. Thus, six of the seven Knight's Crosses awarded on May 8 and 9 (all were the addition of Swords to previous recipients) are not considered legal.

Recipients

Analysis of the German Federal Archives revealed evidence for 7,161 officially bestowed recipients. The German Federal Archives substantiate 863 awards of the Oak Leaves to the Knight's Cross, along with the 147 Swords and 27 Diamonds awards. Author Veit Scherzer concluded that every presentation of the Knight's Cross of the Iron Cross, or one of its higher grades, made until 20 April 1945 is verifiable in the German Federal Archives. The first echelon of the Heerespersonalamt Abteilung P 5/Registratur (Army Personnel Office Department P 5/Registry) was relocated from Zossen in Brandenburg to Traunstein in Bavaria on this day and the confusion regarding who can be considered a legitimate Knight's Cross recipient began.

Hitler frequently made the presentations of the Oak Leaves and higher grades himself. The first presentations in 1940 and 1941 were made in the Reich Chancellery in Berlin or at the Berghof near Berchtesgaden. Beginning with Operation Barbarossa, the invasion of the Soviet Union, the presentations were made at the Führer Headquarters "Wolf's Lair" in East Prussia, in the "Werwolf" near Vinnytsia in Ukraine, and at the Berghof. After the 20 July plot, the presentations were only made sporadically by Hitler himself. The last presentations by Hitler were made early in 1945 in the Führerbunker in Berlin. Senior commanders, like the commanders in chief of the Kriegsmarine and the Luftwaffe, and from the autumn of 1944 also by the Reichsführer-SS Heinrich Himmler, made the presentations instead.

Association of Knight's Cross Recipients
The Association of Knight's Cross Recipients (AKCR) (German language: Ordensgemeinschaft der Ritterkreuzträger des Eisernen Kreuzes e.V. (OdR)) is an association of highly decorated soldiers of both world wars. The association was founded in 1955 in Cologne by Alfred Keller, Knight of the Order Pour le Mérite and recipient of the Knight's Cross of the Iron Cross. Later, the recipients of the Prussian Golden Military Merit Cross, or the Pour le Mérite for enlisted personnel, were included. The AKCR lists the awarding of 7318 Knight's Crosses, as well as 882 Oak Leaves, 159 Swords, 27 Diamonds, 1 Golden Oak Leaves and 1 Grand Cross of the Iron Cross for all ranks in the three branches of the Wehrmacht and the Waffen-SS. However, 200 of the OdR-listed cases are lacking an official proof of award. 

In 1999, German SPD Minister of Defence Rudolf Scharping banned any contacts between the Bundeswehr and the association, stating that it and many of its members shared neo-Nazi and revanchist ideas which were not in conformity with the German constitution and Germany's postwar policies.

Post-war

The German Law about Titles, Orders and Honorary Signs (German language: Gesetz über Titel, Orden und Ehrenzeichen) regulates the wearing of the Knight's Cross in post World War II Germany. German law prohibits wearing a swastika, so on 26 July 1957 the West German government authorized replacement Knight's Crosses with an Oak Leaf Cluster in place of the swastika, similar to the Iron Cross of 1914, and the denazified Iron Cross of 1957, which could be worn by World War II recipients.

References

Citations

Bibliography

 
 
 Maerz, Dietrich (2007). Das Ritterkreuz des Eisernen Kreuzes und seine Höheren Stufen (in German). Richmond, MI: B&D Publishing LLC. .
 Maerz, Dietrich (2007) "The Knights Cross of the Iron Cross and its Higher Grades" (in English), Richmind, MI, B&D Publishing LLC, .
 Potempa, Harald (2003). Das Eiserne Kreuz—Zur Geschichte einer Auszeichnung (in German). Luftwaffenmuseum der Bundeswehr Berlin-Gatow.
 
 
 
 

Cross symbols
Awards established in 1939
Military awards and decorations of Nazi Germany
Courage awards
1939 establishments in Germany